The Book of Hosea is collected as one of the twelve minor prophets of the Nevi'im ("Prophets") in the Tanakh, and as a book in its own right in the Christian Old Testament. According to the traditional order of most Hebrew Bibles, it is the first of the Twelve.

Set around the fall of the Northern Kingdom of Israel, the Book of Hosea denounces the worship of gods other than Yahweh (the God of Israel), metaphorically comparing Israel's abandonment of Yahweh to a woman being unfaithful to her husband. According to the book's narrative, the relationship between Hosea and his unfaithful wife Gomer is comparable to the relationship between Yahweh and his unfaithful people Israel. The eventual reconciliation of Hosea and Gomer is treated as a hopeful metaphor for the eventual reconciliation between Yahweh and Israel.

Hosea is the source of the phrase "reap the whirlwind", which has passed into common usage in English and other languages.

Background and content 

Hosea prophesied during a dark and melancholic era of Israel's history, the period of the Northern Kingdom's decline and fall in the 8th century BC. According to the book, the apostasy of the people was rampant, having turned away from God in order to serve both the calves of Jeroboam and Baal, a Canaanite god.

The Book of Hosea says that, during Hosea's lifetime, the kings of the Northern Kingdom, their aristocratic supporters, and the priests had led the people away from the Law of God, as given in the Pentateuch. It says that they forsook the worship of God; they worshiped other gods, especially Baal, the Canaanite storm god, and Asherah, a Canaanite fertility goddess. Other sins followed, says the Book, including homicide, perjury, theft, and sexual sin. Hosea declares that unless they repent of these sins, God will allow their nation to be destroyed, and the people will be taken into captivity by Assyria, the greatest nation of the time.

The prophecy of Hosea centers on God's unending love towards a sinful Israel. In this text, God's agony is expressed over his betrayal by Israel. Stephen Cook asserts that the prophetic efforts of this book can be summed up in this passage "I have been the Lord your God ever since the land of Egypt; you know no God but me, and besides me there is no savior". Hosea's job was to speak these words during a time when they had been essentially forgotten.

Summary 
The Book of Hosea contains a number of prophecies and messages for both Judah and Northern Israel (Samaria) from God. These are delivered by the prophet Hosea.

General outline

 Chapters 1–2: Hosea's marriage with Gomer described biographically, which is a metaphor for the relationship with God and Israel.
 Chapter 3: Hosea's marriage described autobiographically; this is possibly a marriage to different women
 Chapters 4–14:9/14:10: Oracle judging Israel, Ephraim in particular, for not living up to the covenant.
No further breakdown of ideas is clear in 4–14:9/14:10. Following this, the prophecy is made that someday this will all be changed, and that God will have pity on Israel.

Chapter two describes a divorce.  This divorce seems to be the end of the covenant between God and the Northern Kingdom. However, it is probable that this was again a symbolic act, in which Hosea divorced Gomer for infidelity, and used the occasion to preach the message of God's rejection of the Northern Kingdom. He ends this prophecy with the declaration that God will one day renew the covenant, and will take Israel back in love.

In chapter three, at God's command, Hosea seeks out Gomer once more. Either she has sold herself into slavery for debt, or she is with a lover who demands money in order to give her up, because Hosea has to buy her back.  He takes her home, but refrains from sexual intimacy with her for many days, to symbolize the fact that Israel will be without a king for many years, but that God will take Israel back, even at a cost to himself.

Chapters 4–14 spell out the allegory at length. Chapters 1–3 speaks of Hosea's family, and the issues with Gomer. Chapters 4–10 contain a series of oracles, or prophetic sermons, showing exactly why God is rejecting the Northern Kingdom (what the grounds are for the divorce). Chapter 11 is God's lament over the necessity of giving up the Northern Kingdom, which is a large part of the people of Israel, whom God loves.  God promises not to give them up entirely. Then, in Chapter 12, the prophet pleads for Israel's repentance. Chapter 13 foretells the destruction of the kingdom at the hands of Assyria, because there has been no repentance. In Chapter 14, the prophet urges Israel to seek forgiveness, and promises its restoration, while urging the utmost fidelity to God.

Matthew 2:13 cites Hosea's prophecy in Hosea 11:1 that God would call His Son out of Egypt as foretelling the flight into Egypt and return to Israel of Joseph, Mary, and the infant Jesus.

In Luke 23:30, Jesus referenced Hosea 10:8 when he said "Then they will begin to say to the mountains 'Cover us" and to the hills, 'Fall on us.' (NRSV) The quote is also echoed in Revelation 6:16.

The capital of the Northern Kingdom fell in 722 BC. All the members of the upper classes and many of the ordinary people were taken captive and carried off to live as prisoners of war.

A summary of Hosea's story
First, Hosea was directed by God to marry a promiscuous woman of ill-repute, and he did so. Marriage here is symbolic of the covenantal relationship between God and Israel. However, Israel has been unfaithful to God by following other gods and breaking the commandments which are the terms of the covenant, hence Israel is symbolized by a harlot who violates the obligations of marriage to her husband.

Second, Hosea and his wife, Gomer, have a son. God commands that the son be named Jezreel. This name refers to a valley in which much blood had been shed in Israel's history, especially by the kings of the Northern Kingdom. The naming of this son was to stand as a prophecy against the reigning house of the Northern Kingdom, that they would pay for that bloodshed. Jezreel's name means "God sows".

Third, the couple have a daughter.  God commands that she be named Lo-ruhamah, meaning "unloved", "pity" or "pitied on" to show Israel that, although God will still have pity on the Southern Kingdom, God will no longer have pity on the Northern Kingdom; its destruction is imminent. In the NIV translation, the omitting of the word "him" leads to speculation as to whether Lo-Ruhamah was the daughter of Hosea or one of Gomer's lovers. James Mays, however, says that the failure to mention Hosea's paternity is "hardly an implication" of Gomer's adultery.

Fourth, a son is born to Gomer.  It is questionable whether this child was Hosea's, for God commands that his name be Lo-ammi, meaning "not my people". The child bore this name of shame to show that the Northern Kingdom would also be shamed, for its people would no longer be known as God's people. In other words, the Northern Kingdom had been rejected by God.

Interpretation and context 
In Hosea 2, the woman in the marriage metaphor could be Hosea's wife Gomer, or could be referring to the nation of Israel, invoking the metaphor of Israel as God's bride. The woman is not portrayed in a positive light. This is reflected throughout the beginning of Hosea 2: "I will strip her naked and expose her as in the day she was born"; "Upon her children I will have no pity, because they are children of whoredom"; "For she said, I will go after my lovers..."

Biblical scholar Ehud Ben Zvi reminds readers of the socio-historical context in which Hosea was composed. In his article "Observations on the marital metaphor of YHWH and Israel in its ancient Israelite context: general considerations and particular images in Hosea 1.2", Ben Zvi describes the role of the Gomer in the marriage metaphor as one of the "central attributes of the ideological image of a human marriage that was shared by the male authorship and the primary and intended male readership as building blocks for their imagining of the relationship."

Tristanne J. Connolly makes a similar observation, stating that the husband-wife motif reflects marriage as it was understood at the time. Connolly also suggests that in context the marriage metaphor was necessary in that it truly exemplified the unequal interaction between God and the people of Israel. Biblical scholar Michael D. Coogan describes the importance of understanding the covenant in relation to interpreting Hosea. According to Coogan, Hosea falls under a unique genre called "covenant lawsuit" where God accuses Israel of breaking their previously made agreement. God's disappointment towards Israel is therefore expressed through the broken marriage covenant made between husband and wife.

Brad E. Kelle refers to "many scholars" finding references to cultic sexual practices in the worship of Baal, in Hosea 2, to be evidence of an historical situation in which Israelites were either giving up Yahweh worship for Baal, or blending the two.  Hosea's references to sexual acts being metaphors for Israelite 'apostasy'.

Hosea 13:1–3 describes how the Israelites are abandoning Yahweh for the worship of Baal, and accuses them of making or using molten images for 'idol' worship.  Chief among these was the image of the bull at the northern shrine of Bethel, which by the time of Hosea was being worshipped as an image of Baal.

Contribution 
Hosea is a prophet whom God uses to portray a message of repentance to God's people. Through Hosea's marriage to Gomer, God shows his great love for his people, comparing himself to a husband whose wife has committed adultery as a metaphor of the covenant between God and Israel. Hosea influenced latter prophets such as Jeremiah. He is among the first writing prophets, and the last chapter of Hosea has a format similar to wisdom literature.

Like Amos, Hosea elevated the religion of Israel to the altitude of ethical monotheism, being the first to emphasize the moral side of God's nature. Israel's faithlessness, which resisted all warnings, compelled him to punish the people because of his own holiness. Hosea considers infidelity as the chief sin, of which Israel, the adulterous wife, has been guilty against her loving husband, God. Against this he sets the unquenchable love of God, who, in spite of this infidelity, does not cast Israel away forever, but will draw his people to himself again after the judgment.

See also
 Reap the whirlwind (phrase)

Notes

External links 

Jewish translations:
 Hoshea – Hosea (Judaica Press) translation [with Rashi's commentary] at Chabad.org
Christian translations:
Online Bible at GospelHall.org
 Hosea at The Great Books (New Revised Standard Version)
 Isagogical Study of the Book of Hosea by: Paul R. Hanke
 Reconsidering the date and provenance of the Book of Hosea by: James M. Bos
 

 
8th-century BC books
Twelve Minor Prophets